The United States' National Reconnaissance Office's Program A was a component of the National Reconnaissance Program (NRP).  Program A took the remnants of the Air Force Office of Special Projects (the successor to the ill-fated SAMOS program office, and redesignated it and refocused its efforts onto the next generation of imagery intelligence gathering satellites (i.e. CORONA/Discoverer, KH-7/8 GAMBIT, KH-9 HEXAGON).

See also
National Reconnaissance Office (NRO)
Program B - NRO efforts run by the Central Intelligence Agency (CIA)
Program C - NRO signals intelligences satellite efforts run by the United States Navy
Program D - NRO air reconnaissance efforts run by the United States Air Force

References

National Reconnaissance Office